The Wonthaggi railway line is a closed railway line located in South Gippsland, Victoria, Australia. Its primary purpose was to serve the State Coal Mine but the line also provided passenger and general goods services. The line was opened in 1910 and closed in 1978.

Background

In the late nineteenth and early twentieth centuries, Victorian Railways depended on black coal to fire its steam locomotives. Although black coal deposits around Korumburra in South Gippsland had been exploited since 1891, the seams were narrow, costs of production were relatively high, and in 1900 their production accounted for just a quarter of Victoria's consumption. It was cheaper for VR to purchase coal from Newcastle, New South Wales, however a protracted miners dispute in 1909 threatened supplies and led to an even stronger commitment by the Murray Government to securing local supplies. With the Korumburra mines unable to meet Victorian Railways' demand for 1000 tons of coal a day, a promising seam on the Powlett River which had been tested in 1908 was rapidly developed as a mine site and the government opened the mine for commercial purposes in 1909. While the first shipments were taken by sea from Inverloch, a railway was rapidly constructed to service the new mine.

Construction

Originally known as the "Powlett River railway", the Wonthaggi line was built extremely rapidly. A  branch line from Nyora to Woolamai had already been approved, branching from the South Gippsland line (the Great Southern Railway) just east of Nyora railway station, but work had not started. In December 1909, a  extension of the branch from Woolamai to the Powlett River coalfield was given parliamentary sanction.

The line carried its first coal in February 1910, with Baldwin-built 4-6-0 locomotive W 227 given the honour of hauling the first train from the Powlett coalfield. As well as passenger and general goods stations to service the rapidly growing town of Wonthaggi, connections were provided to the State Mine (on the up side of Wonthaggi) and to later additional mine extensions at Dudley and Kirrak.

Traffic

By 1928, twelve return passenger services also ran on the line per week, with a journey time from Flinders Street station to Wonthaggi taking approximately four hours.

The introduction of diesel rail motors in the 1950s saw a reduction in journey times for passenger services on the line to around three hours by 1954, but service frequency was now eleven return passenger services operating per week.

Decline and closure

The conversion of Victorian Railways from steam to diesel-electric power during the 1950s and 1960s reduced demand for black coal and in 1968 the mine closed. Passenger services from Nyora to Wonthaggi were withdrawn on 4 December 1977 with the last train being a 153hp Walker railmotor. By this time the general decline of Victorian branch line network saw services being withdrawn from a number of lines, and the Wonthaggi line closed on 21 November 1978 when a final goods train returned to Melbourne with staff equipment from stations along the line.

The track was dismantled in 1988 and the southern section from Anderson to Wonthaggi has been developed as the Bass Coast Rail Trail.

References

Further reading 
 The Wonthaggi Branch Gavan-Duffy, C.D. Australian Railway Historical Society Bulletin, August 1959, pp. 122–126

Closed regional railway lines in Victoria (Australia)
Railway lines opened in 1910
Railway lines closed in 1978
Transport in Gippsland (region)
Bass Coast Shire